Sabr ad-Din I was a sultan of the Ifat Sultanate. He was the son of Nahwi bin Mansur bin Umar Walashma and younger brother of Haqq ad-Din I.

Reign
Sabr ad-Din rallied his fellow Muslims in a counter-offensive in early 1332 against the Christian Ethiopians. However, the Emperor Amda Seyon I defeated him in battle, then invaded a number of Islamic kingdoms, including Dawaro and Bale. This brought an end to the independent kingdoms of Hadiya, Fatager, Dawaro and Ifat.

Sabr ad-Din was captured with his ally, King Haydara of Dawaro, and the two were imprisoned together. The Emperor Amda Seyon appointed as his successor his brother, Jamal ad-Din I.

See also
Sabr ad-Din II
Walashma dynasty

Notes

14th-century monarchs in Africa
Sultans of Ifat
14th-century Somalian people